The Handball Korea League is a handball league in South Korea. The league has been sponsored by the SK Group since 2011 and is therefore called the SK Handball Korea League.

The league finals are hosted at the SK Olympic Handball Gymnasium within the Olympic Park in Seoul.

2022–23 teams

Men's
Chungnam Provincial Office
Doosan Handball Club
Hanam Handball Club
Incheon Housing and City Development Corporation
Sangmu Phoenix (Korea Armed Forces Athletic Corps Handball Team)
SK Hawks

Women's
Busan Infrastructure Corporation
Daegu Metropolitan City Hall
Gwangju City Corporation
Gyeongnam Development Corporation
Incheon Metropolitan City Hall
Samcheok City Hall
Seoul City
SK Sugar Gliders

Champions

Men's

Titles by season

Titles by club

Women's

Titles by season

Titles by club

References

External links
Official website 

Handball competitions in South Korea
Korea, South
Sports leagues in South Korea
Handball in South Korea
Women's handball in South Korea